Robert Hägg (born 8 February 1995) is a Swedish professional ice hockey player for the Detroit Red Wings of the National Hockey League (NHL). He was selected by the Philadelphia Flyers in the second round (41st overall) of the 2013 NHL Entry Draft.

Playing career

Junior
Robert Hägg started his hockey career at age 13 playing for Gimo IF in Gimo, Uppland. In his second season, at age 14, Hägg recorded 16 points in 32 games played for Gimo. In the 2010-11 Season, now on MODO U16, Hägg had a breakout year leading the U16 SM league in assists and points by a defenseman. Additionally, he won the U16 SM defenseman of the year award.

Professional
On 21 March 2014, the Philadelphia Flyers signed Hägg to a three-year entry-level contract. Hägg made his NHL debut on 9 April 2017 against the Carolina Hurricanes in the last game of the Flyers regular season.

During the 2017–18 season Hägg recorded his first NHL goal in a 4–3 win over the Detroit Red Wings on 21 December 2017. Hägg led the NHL in hits with 232 and rookies in blocked shots before being pulled out of the lineup with a lower body injury on 10 March 2018.

On 23 July 2021, Hägg was traded by the Flyers to the Buffalo Sabres, along with a 2021 first-round pick and a 2023 second-round pick, in exchange for Rasmus Ristolainen. In the  season, Hägg continued his role as a physical third-pairing defensemen for the Sabres. He was leading the team in hits and short-handed time on ice while collecting 8 points through 48 regular season games. Hägg was dealt by the Sabres approaching the NHL trade deadline to the Florida Panthers in exchange for a 2022 sixth-round pick on 20 March 2022.

On 25 July 2022, Hägg signed to a one-year, $800,000 contract with the Detroit Red Wings.

International play

Hägg played throughout his junior career at the International stage for Sweden, culminating in two silver medals at the 2013 World Junior Championships in Ufa, Russia and 2014 in Malmö, Sweden.

On 9 May 2019, Hägg was named to make his senior international debut with Sweden at the 2019 World Championships held in Bratislava, Slovakia.

Career statistics

Regular season and playoffs

International

References

External links
 

1995 births
Adirondack Phantoms players
Buffalo Sabres players
Detroit Red Wings players
Florida Panthers players
Lehigh Valley Phantoms players
Living people
Modo Hockey players
Sportspeople from Uppsala
Philadelphia Flyers draft picks
Philadelphia Flyers players
Swedish ice hockey defencemen